Immidivarappadu is a village in Amalapuram Mandal, Dr. B.R. Ambedkar Konaseema district in the state of Andhra Pradesh in India.

Geography 

Demographics 
 India census, Immidivarappadu had a population of 1151, out of which 577 were male and 574 were female. The population of children below 6 years of age was 10%. The literacy rate of the village was 83%.

References 

Villages in Amalapuram Mandal